The 1998–99 Oklahoma State Cowboys basketball team represented Oklahoma State University as a member of the Big 12 Conference during the 1998–99 NCAA Division I men's basketball season. They were led by 9th-year head coach Eddie Sutton and played their home games at Gallagher-Iba Arena in Stillwater, Oklahoma. They finished the season 23–11, 10–6 in Big 12 play to finish in a tie for fifth place. The Cowboys lost to Kansas in the championship game of the Big 12 tournament. The team received an at-large bid to the NCAA tournament as the No. 9 seed in the South region. Oklahoma State defeated No. 8 seed Syracuse in the opening round before losing to No. 1 seed Auburn in the second round.

Roster

Source:

Schedule and results

|-
!colspan=9 style=| Regular season

|-
!colspan=9 style=| Big 12 Tournament

|-
!colspan=9 style=| NCAA Tournament

Rankings

References

Oklahoma State Cowboys basketball seasons
Oklahoma State
1998 in sports in Oklahoma
1999 in sports in Oklahoma
Oklahoma State